"Daybreak's Bell" is the thirty-third single by L'Arc-en-Ciel, released on October 10, 2007. It also has a P'unk-en-Ciel track, "Natsu no Yuutsu [Sea in Blood 2007]", a remake of their fourth single "Natsu no Yuu-utsu [Time to say Good-bye]". It debuted at number 1 in the Oricon singles sales chart.

This song serves as the first opening for the  anime Mobile Suit Gundam 00, and the ending songs for the final episodes of both seasons. The first press versions of this single include Gundam 00 memorabilia. The Gundam 00 opening version is also playable in the Nintendo DS game Metcha! Taiko no Tatsujin DS: Nanatsu no Shima no Daibouken.

Track listing

Oricon sales chart (Japan)

References

2007 singles
L'Arc-en-Ciel songs
Oricon Weekly number-one singles
Songs written by Hyde (musician)
Songs written by Ken (musician)
Anime songs
2007 songs
Ki/oon Music singles